The Battle of Vich or Battle of Vic on 20 February 1810 saw a Spanish force under Henry O'Donnell suddenly attack a 5,500-man Imperial French division led by Joseph Souham. After bitter fighting the French prevailed, forcing O'Donnell's men to retreat. The engagement occurred during the Peninsular War, part of the Napoleonic Wars.

One month after his lieutenant Luis González Torres de Navarra, Marquess of Campoverde scored a victory in the Battle of Mollet, O'Donnell found that Souham's division was isolated at Vic. He assembled a small army of 7,000 regular infantry and 500 cavalry at Moià and arranged for the miquelets (Catalan militia) to join him in attacking Vic. On 19 February, 3,500 miquelets led by Francesc Rovira i Sala and Francisco Milans del Bosch began skirmishing with Souham's outposts. The next day, O'Donnell led his regulars to the assault from a different direction. While a French force in the town held off Rovira and Milans, the main forces battled in the plain. The contest hung in the balance until the 1,500-saber Imperial cavalry contingent overwhelmed O'Donnell's right wing. The French lost 600 casualties, including Souham badly wounded, while inflicting losses of 800 killed and wounded and capturing 1,000 more.

Notes

References

Further reading

External links
 

Battles of the Peninsular War
Battles of the Napoleonic Wars
Battles in Catalonia
Battles involving Spain
Battles involving France
Battles involving Italy
Conflicts in 1810
February 1810 events
Battles inscribed on the Arc de Triomphe